Yedyanchi Jatra is a Marathi film released in India on 3 February 2012.

Plot
Harya dreams of leaving his small village, but promises his grandfather on his deathbed that he will stay and take care of the family farm. He comes up with a scheme to settle the problem of where to put nightsoil. Meanwhile, landlord  Bhangade Patil plots to take over his land.

Cast
 Bharat Jadhav as Harya
 Vinay Apte as Kadu Anna Patil
 Mohan Joshi as Bhangade Patil  
 Mahesh Raut as Mohan
 Monika Pandit as Rani
 Sneha Kulkarni as Sangi
 Paddy Kamble as  Nayanrao
 Shweta Tiwari in an item number by Saroj Khan

Soundtrack

The music is composed by Kshitij Wagh and lyrics by Guru Thakur.

Track list

References

External links 
 

2010s Marathi-language films